Power Twins may refer to:

 Larry Sontag (Larry Power) and David Sontag (Dave Power), American wrestlers of Windy City Pro Wrestling
 Diane and Elaine Klimaszewski, the Klimaszewski Twins, or Power Twins, Polish American models